WDRU (1030 AM) is a radio station  broadcasting a Christian radio format. Licensed to Creedmoor, North Carolina, United States, the station serves the Raleigh, North Carolina area.  The station is owned by Truth Broadcasting Corporation.

WDRU broadcasts Wake Forest Demon Deacons sports programming, beginning with the 2012 football season. Its parent company, Truth Broadcasting, reached a deal with WEGO in Winston-Salem and WKEW in Greensboro to provide coverage along the I-40 corridor, which had been covered by WZTK before flipping to Spanish programming.

History
WFTK was a Christian radio station and later aired Spanish language programming before Truth Broadcasting changed to the current format.

The station was licensed as WBZN in 1984, but signed on September 1, 1989 as WFTK, owned by the Baker Family Stations, from studios along North Carolina Highway 56 in Butner. On May 3, 2005, WFTK became WDRU.

Originally licensed to Wake Forest, the station moved its license to Creedmoor in 2005.  It also altered its signal pattern in order to better serve listeners in the western portion of the Triangle (Durham, Chapel Hill).

Translators
WDRU broadcasts during daytime hours only unlike its sister station, WTRU in the Greensboro/Winston-Salem market.  This is to protect WBZ in Boston. However, the station does operate FM translators, both which broadcast 24 hours. The station is also heard in HD Radio at 103.9-2, WNNL HD2.

References

External links 

 WDRU Home Page on Truth Network

 
 
 
 
 
 

DRU
Radio stations established in 1989
1989 establishments in North Carolina
DRU
DRU